M42 or M-42 may refer to:

In science:
 Messier 42, a nebula also called the Orion Nebula
 the 42nd Mersenne prime, 225964951-1, discovered in 2005
an Y-chromosomal mutation, see Haplogroup B-M42

In transportation:
 M42 motorway, a motorway in the United Kingdom
 M-42 (Michigan highway), a state highway in Michigan
 M42 (Cape Town), a Metropolitan Route in Cape Town, South Africa
 M42 (Pretoria), a Metropolitan Route in Pretoria, South Africa
 M42 (New York City bus), a New York City Bus route in Manhattan
 BMW M42, a 1989 automobile piston engine
 Dodge M42, ¾-ton command truck, 1950s
 M42 (sub-basement), a power station at New York City's Grand Central Terminal

In photography:
 M42 lens mount, a standard for cameras

In firearms and military equipment:
 Ag m/42, a Swedish semi-automatic rifle which saw limited use by the Swedish Army from 1942 until the 1960s
 M42 Duster, a United States Army self-propelled anti-aircraft gun
 M42 (gas mask), a United States military gas mask
 M/42 (bicycle), a Swedish military bicycle
 45 mm anti-tank gun M1942 (M-42), a Soviet anti-tank gun (Motovilikha Plants)
 Duperite M42 helmet, an Australian WWII helmet
 M42 Stahlhelm, a type of German WWII helmet
 M42, a Smith & Wesson hammerless revolver
 M42 United Defense submachine gun, an American weapon used in World War II

In manufacturing:
 M42 is the Unified numbering system code ("miscellaneous nonferrous metals and alloys") for a grade of high-speed steel with cobalt

See also
 M1942 (disambiguation)